Mário Michalík (born 30 January 1973 in Zvolen) is a Slovak football goalkeeper who currently plays for the 5. liga club TJ Stožok.

1. FK Příbram
He made two appearances for 1. FK Příbram in the Czech Gambrinus liga during 2007/2008 season.

External links
1. FK Příbram profile

References

1973 births
Living people
Slovak footballers
Association football goalkeepers
FK Dukla Banská Bystrica players
MŠK Novohrad Lučenec players
1. FK Příbram players
FC Vysočina Jihlava players
TJ Baník Ružiná players
Czech First League players
Expatriate footballers in the Czech Republic
Sportspeople from Zvolen